Menara is the name of a yellow meranti (Shorea faguetiana) tree found in the Danum Valley Conservation Area, in Sabah, Malaysia. The research team, working with Southeast Asia Rainforest Research Partnership (SEARRP), named the tree “Menara”, which means "tower" in the Malay language due to its towering height.

Menara was discovered in August 2018.  A research team scanned the tree in August 2018 with a terrestrial laser scanner and drone flights to produce a 3D model.  On January 6, 2019, Unding Jami and his team established a measurement for the tree by climbing it and measuring its height using a tape measure. Menara is likely the tallest flowering plant in the world as it is taller than the previous record holder, a mountain ash (Eucalyptus regnans) in Tasmania that may be 100.5 m tall.

Menara weighs nearly 81,500 kilograms not counting its roots. 95% of this mass is located in the trunk, while 5% comes from the 40 meter-wide crown. The stem is extremely straight, with its center of mass at 28 m above the ground, which is just 0.6 m off from the central vertical axis. This indicates that the tree is highly symmetrical and well-balanced, even though it is sitting on a slope.

In 2020, Pos Malaysia Berhad release a stamp set featuring Menara. The set also includes a miniature sheet 18 centimetres in length, making it the largest stamp ever released by Pos Malaysia.

See also
 List of tallest trees
 List of individual trees
 List of superlative trees

References

Individual trees in Malaysia